= Phinyo Pukphinyo =

Phinyo Pukphinyo (Thai: ภิญโญ พุกภิญโญ) is a Thai firefighter and snake catcher. A sergeant at Bangkok's Disaster Prevention Center, Pukphinyo leads the team responsible for nuisance snake removal in Bangkok. Pukphinyo's team receives more calls for snake removals than fires, between 2,000 and 3,000 calls per week. By 2019, Pukphinyo had caught about 10,000 snakes.
